J. Richmond Pearson (January 10, 1930 – October 22, 2014) was an American politician who served in the Alabama Senate from 1974 to 1990.

He died on October 22, 2014, in Birmingham, Alabama at age 84.

References

1930 births
2014 deaths
Democratic Party Alabama state senators